António Dias dos Santos (born 3 September 1964) is an Angolan long jumper and triple jumper.

At the 1987 Central African Games he won the gold medal in the triple jump and the silver medal in the long jump. At the 1988 African Championships he won the gold medal in the triple jump. 

He also competed in the triple jump at the 1988 Summer Olympics, the 1991 World Indoor Championships and the 1992 Summer Olympics without reaching the final. He also competed in long jump at the 1987 World Championships and the 1991 World Indoor Championships without reaching the final.

His personal best triple jump was 16.43 metres, achieved in 1988.

References

External links
 

1964 births
Living people
Angolan long jumpers
Angolan male triple jumpers
World Athletics Championships athletes for Angola
Athletes (track and field) at the 1988 Summer Olympics
Athletes (track and field) at the 1992 Summer Olympics
Olympic athletes of Angola
Place of birth missing (living people)